The Inishkea Islands (Irish: Inis Cé) are situated off the coast of the Belmullet peninsula in Ireland. The islands are believed to be named after a saint that lived on the island called Saint Kea. There are two main islands - Inishkea North and Inishkea South. 

In the 19th-century, the islands were notable for the pagan religious traditions that were practiced there. One tradition involved a small terracotta statue of a saint known as the Godstone or Naomhóg in Irish, which was worshiped as an idol. It is possible that the remoteness of the islands somehow preserved some form of pre-Christian Celtic religion. In the early 1900s the islands were populated with more than 350 people, who were all monolingual Irish speakers but the island gradually depopulated after 48 fisherman tragically drowned at sea during a fierce storm in October 1927. There are currently two people who live on the island, although it increases to around fifteen during the summer months of May to September.

History 

The earliest evidence of settlement on the island goes back at least 5,000 years and the islands have numerous archaeological sites from the Neolithic and several Early Christian monastic sites. Early Christian sites dating from the sixth to the tenth centuries are found on most of the Erris islands including Duvillaun and Inishglora.

The islands had a number of owners including the Barretts, who were a Norman family, the McCormacks who were given the island by King James I and finally the O'Donnells of Newport who took control of them in the 18th century. It is believed by many historians that the islands were abandoned in the Middle Ages before being re-inhabited in the 17th century.

Famine 
During the Irish Famine, the people on the Inishkea islands were not immune.   Like most places in the west of Ireland, the pattern of lazy beds can be seen on the island wherever there was enough soil to sow potatoes, even on the outer reaches near the cliff edge. While the lack of shelter would have made conditions too harsh for potatoes to flourish, the threat of starvation meant that every option had to be tried.  

However, unlike other areas of the west coast, the famine did not affect the Inishkeas as badly as the mainland. While the population on the mainland fell dramatically during the famine years, it was the opposite on the Inishkea islands because it would appear that potato blight was confined to the mainland. The prevailing winds would have kept the blight off the islands to a degree. The islanders also had the tradition of fishing.

Piracy 
It is alleged that the [island inhabitants] were always vigorously and actively engaged in piracy from the island. They were attacking and robbing boats passing west of them. "This was the whole island and [the operation] was highly organised, robbing the boats, taking the cargo and distributing it across the island. Wrecking was common along the west coast so the authorities had to deploy Royal Naval ships to stamp it out and there were islanders shot and killed as they attacked the passing vessels. The deliberate wrecking was an alternative enterprise because in the areas along the west coast there was no regulation. However, when coastguards were posted to coastal sites in the latter part of the 19th century, they were despised and hated and they were a disaster, economically, for these islands because they stamped out wrecking and smuggling."

Pagan religion and The Godstone 
The evangelical Irish Protestant Robert Jocelyn wrote the following about the unusual religious practices of the islands' inhabitants in 1851:"...save during the few and necessarily short visits of the clergyman of the parish, seldom have they heard of eternal life as the free gift of God through Jesus Christ, and even these visits were unprofitable from their total ignorance of English... their worship consists in occasional meetings at their chief’s house, with visits to a holy well, called in their native tongue, Derivla... Here the absence of religion is filled with the open practice of Pagan idolatry... In the South Island, in the house of a man named Monigan, a stone idol, called in the Irish ‘Neevougi’ has been from time immemorial religiously preserved and worshipped. This god in appearance resembles a thick roll of home-spun flannel, which arises from the custom of dedicating a dress of that material to it, whenever its aid is sought; this is sewed on by an old woman, its priestess, whose peculiar care it is."In 1940 English author T. H. White visited the islands and learned the tale of what    called the "Neevougi" (probably Naomhóg, roughly translating to "little saint"). According to White, the inhabitants of the islands credited the stone with calming weather, speeding the growth of potatoes, and quelling fire, but that it had allegedly been cast into the sea in the 1890s by one Fr. O'Reilly. White's discoveries - which include encounters with pirates, the theft of the stone from North to South Inishkea by islanders jealous of its potato-growing properties, a thrice (or once) annual ceremony where the stone was re-"clothed" in new cloth, and the niche in the wall of a south Inishkea hut where the Naomhóg had formerly resided - are recorded in his book The Godstone and the Blackymor, which was based upon his contemporary journal.

A well known archaeologist, Françoise Henry visited these offshore islands in the 1930s and again in the 1950s. On Inishkea North (which is less visited than the south island) are the ruins of St. Colmcille's Church, the Bailey Mór, Bailey Beag and Bailey Dóite, small circular areas which contained beehive huts, used by monks in the Early Christian period. On the south island is a tall cross inscribed slab and to its west, the foundations of a small church. This suggests that Inishkea was an important centre in the Early Christian period, but that the islanders somehow reverted to pagan beliefs at some point.

1927 Storm 
In October 1927, local fishermen were caught in a sudden violent storm. Some of the currachs managed to reach home but several failed to get back and one was reputed to have been taken all the way in and thrown up on the mainland with its crew unharmed. 48 fisherman from the islands tragically drowned at sea during a fierce storm in October 1927. The island community was devastated and a few years later the community was rehoused, mostly on the Mullet Peninsula. Those  who had escaped often related the tale of that fateful night. The last survivor, Pat Reilly, died at age 101 in 2008.

Whaling and shellfish 

IN 1908, a Norwegian whaling station was established on Rusheen a small island, a short distance away from the south Iniskea island which is connected to the south island when the tide goes out. Environmental rules and regulations in Norway at the time meant that a lot of the whaling stations there had to be closed down and moved to other countries, like Ireland, where the regulations were not as strict.  The industry was short-lived as it lasted only ten years, but it employed a number of local people in difficult times. The presence of the station caused tension between north and south islands, because it is said that all the jobs went to the south islanders and the north islanders were left with just the foul smell from the station.

The whale industry on the Inishkeas did not begin and end at the beginning of the 20th century. Sperm whales were a common sight off the coast during the Middle Ages and the most important product at the time to come from the sperm whale was its vomit, Ambergris. Ambergris is highly valuable because it has a sweet scent and is sold as perfume and medicine. It was traded in the 17th century from the coast of Connacht through Galway to Spain and onto the spice markets of Cairo and Baghdad where he said it was worth a 'small fortune'.

In 1946, French archaeologist Francoise Henry excavated evidence of a 7th-century dye workshop on Inishkea North, where the monks in an early Christian Monastery were producing it from the shells of the dog whelk. The dye fetched high prices at the time, it was in high demand.

One letter in the Book of Kells would take 500 shells to get enough colour to decorate it. Purple was very important because in early Irish laws only the royalty could wear purple.  The tradition came from the Roman tradition, who took it from the Greeks, who borrowed that tradition from the Phoenicians.

Geography and Current State 
The islands lie between Inishglora to their north and Duvillaun to their south, off the Mullet's west coast, and offer some protection to the mainland coast from the power of the eastern Atlantic Ocean. The underlying rock of the Inishkea Island is gneiss and schist, the same as that on the Mullet.  The islands are relatively low lying and are covered in machair. Fine white sand is found everywhere, often blown into drifts by the strong winds especially along the beach beside the harbour where it fills the houses of the abandoned village. The sea surrounding the islands is crystal clear.

The islands are little known outside of the local area but are well known by fishermen who use the island harbour regularly.  There are regular trips from Falmore on the mainland to the islands when weather permits and after a trip taking about half-an-hour, the boat ties up at the pier right beside the pure white sandy beach lined with little ruined cottages, some of them with slate and galvanised roofs and in habitable condition (these being used by surveyors etc. doing work on the islands). Sand has taken its toll on most of the buildings with the floors covered in several feet of white sand blown in from the beach. The island is inhabited by donkeys and many sheep. People can now visit the island via a ferry service provided by the Inishkea Island Ferry, better known as Belmullet Boat Charters.

Flora and fauna 

The Inishkea islands are home to large numbers of Atlantic grey seals and the coves and beaches across the islands are the largest breeding colonies for grey seals in Ireland.
Over 300 pups are born annually on the islands, compared to just 150-180 in the mid-1990s. However, when pups are born they can't go into the sea for the first ten days and there is a high mortality rate with only 50 per cent of pups expected to survive the first year.
While the seals are a protected species, there have been instances of them being culled by fishermen in the past because they bite at fish caught in nets. In the early 1980s over 120 seals and pups were killed on the beaches of the islands but the numbers gradually recovered over the last number of years.

The islands are also home to a number of bird species- the geese of the island's name are barnacle geese. In addition, the islands have wheatears, rock pipits and fulmars. Lapwing breed on the island and peregrine falcons hunt for prey. There is evidence of rabbits on the island.
The islands have no trees and are composed almost entirely of machair with outcrops of rock. They are crisscrossed by a number of stone walls that provide some shelter for nesting birds.

References

External links 
Inishkea Islands, Irish Islands.
Inishkea Islands Official Website
 The Mayo News

Islands of County Mayo
Gaeltacht places in County Mayo